Janusz Sałach (born 9 January 1957) is a Polish former cyclist. He competed in the team pursuit event at the 1980 Summer Olympics.

References

External links
 

1957 births
Living people
Polish male cyclists
Olympic cyclists of Poland
Cyclists at the 1980 Summer Olympics
Sportspeople from Toruń